John Smith was an English footballer.

Career
Smith played for Scotswood and Derby County, before joining Port Vale in August 1932. He never made his mark at The Old Recreation Ground, and played just six Second Division games during the 1932–33 season. He was given a free transfer to Carlisle United in May 1933.

Career statistics
Source:

References

English footballers
Association football forwards
Derby County F.C. players
Port Vale F.C. players
Carlisle United F.C. players
English Football League players
Year of birth missing
Year of death missing